Atalophlebia is a genus of mayflies in the family Leptophlebiidae. They can be found in Australia.

Species
The genus contains the following species:
Atalophlebia albiterminata
Atalophlebia aurata
Atalophlebia australasica
Atalophlebia australis
Atalophlebia darrunga
Atalophlebia gubara
Atalophlebia hudsoni
Atalophlebia ida
Atalophlebia incerta
Atalophlebia kala
Atalophlebia kokunia
Atalophlebia longicaudata
Atalophlebia maculosa
Atalophlebia marowana
Atalophlebia miunga
Atalophlebia pallida
Atalophlebia pierda
Atalophlebia superba
Atalophlebia tuhla

References

Mayfly genera
Leptophlebiidae
Insects of Australia